18th parallel may refer to:
18th parallel north, a circle of latitude in the Northern Hemisphere
18th parallel south, a circle of latitude in the Southern Hemisphere